This article contains a brief list of press headlines relevant to the Assyrian genocide in chronological order, as recorded in newspaper archives.

See also 
 Assyrian genocide
 Assyrian war of independence

External links 
 Assyrian Holocaust: Newspapers and Periodicals

Assyrian genocide
Headlines